Robert Kelley (born May 8, 1930) is a former American football center who played for the Philadelphia Eagles. He played college football at West Texas A&M University, having previously attended Bovina High School.

References

1930 births
Living people
American football centers
West Texas A&M Buffaloes football players
Philadelphia Eagles players
Players of American football from Texas
People from Hereford, Texas